Arvinder Singh Lovely (born 11 December 1968) is an Indian politician and a member of Indian National Congress. He is a former president of the Delhi Pradesh Congress Committee (Delhi PCC). In 1998, he was elected to the Delhi Legislative Assembly as the youngest MLA from Gandhi Nagar constituency. He was again elected in 2003, 2008 & 2013. He has also been the Minister for Urban Development & Revenue, Education, Transport, Tourism, Languages, Gurudwara Election, Local Bodies & Gurudwara Administration in the Sheila Dikshit government of Delhi.

Early life and education

Arvinder Singh Lovely was born to Mr. & Mrs. Balwinder Singh. Born & brought up in Gandhinagar, he developed a keen interest in social & political issues at a young age. While pursuing his graduation from SGTB Khalsa College, University of Delhi in Political Science, he was elected to the Students' Union of the college and was actively involved with various social & academic organisations.  He also rose to become the Chairman of Bhimrao Ambedkar College, Delhi, He was elected as the General Secretary of the Delhi Pradesh Youth Congress in 1990 and then served as the General Secretary of the National Student Union of India (NSUI) between 1992-1996. He is married to Gurveen Kaur, and has two sons Parminder & Navjot Singh.

Political Career

Development Work as MLA, Gandhinagar

As the MLA, Lovely took a keen interest in developing infrastructure of Gandhinagar, facilitating it to become the most well-developed & prosperous region in East Delhi. The first metro station to open in East Delhi was Gandhinagar. He opened 6 community centers, 5 schools, 2 underground water tanks (12 lakh & 1 lakh gallons), 4 hospitals / dispensaries and laid down sewer lines throughout Gandhinagar.

He undertook the regularization of West Kantinagar, East Azad Nagar, Naya Shanti Mohalla & Kantinagar Ext. Gandhinagar being the largest wholesale readymade clothes market in Asia, he worked towards the declaration of each lane in Gandhinagar as ‘commercial’ in the MP 2020 for the city of Delhi.

He undertook the construction of 4 bridges in the Gandhinagar area during his tenure - Geeta Colony, Mayur Vihar, Nizammudin Bridge & Wazirabad Bridge. In addition, he sanctioned the Signature Bridge construction, and laid its foundation stone, marking the beginning of the construction of the bridge.

As Minister of Education

Arvinder Singh Lovely has been the longest standing Education Minister in Delhi, bringing in many reforms that stand until today. He introduced the Point System of admissions into schools, aiming to abolish bias and corruption in the admissions processes. He introduced the EWS (Economically Weaker Section) & Laadli Schemes. His efforts to increase inclusiveness in the schools resulted in higher enrollment rates and lower dropout rates. Inheriting a dropout rate of 7.8% in government schools, Lovely lowered this rate to a record-low 1.7%.

As Minister of Urban Development & Revenue

Lovely regularised almost 1000 colonies across Delhi and introduced Delhi Development of Urban Village Scheme, benefitting 135 urban villages covering 45 lakh people. He undertook development of slums into flats, and granted ownership rights to the slum dwellers.

In addition, he worked towards strengthening the infrastructure and connectivity by constructing Pushta Road, 4 Elevated Roads (Barapulla, Vikaspuri - Mirabagh, Mangolpuri to Madhuban Chowk & Madhuban Chowk to Mukarba Chowk) and many more flyovers.

As Minister of Transport

Lovely was single-handedly responsible for replacing the Blue Line buses with Low Floor buses, and more than doubled number of buses, significantly increasing road safety in Delhi. He upgraded the entire Delhi bus fleet to CNG in record-time of 6 months as Transport Minister. He is also credited with the centralisation & interlinking of all transport authorities in Delhi.

In his tenure as Transport Minister, he sanctioned the monorail addressing the congestion problem and introduced budget Radio Taxis. In addition, he constructed 14 new DTC Depots, including Millennium Depot (1, 2, 3 & 4), Narela , Kanjhawala (1 & 2), Dwarka (Sector 2 & 8), Ghumanhera,  Rajghat, Tehkhand. He also introduced 4 DTC Terminals in Punjabi Bagh, Dwarka Sector 18, Vishwas Nagar & Shakurbasti.

Awards & Accolades
 2001-2002 Best MLA, Delhi (Awarded by Delhi Assembly)
 Education Ministry was ranked as Best performing ministry under him by the survey conducted by Aaj Tak
 Best MLA as per Times of India & Hindustan Times (HT-CSDS Survey) for the year 2003

References

External links 
 Profile on the Delhi Legislatively Assembly website

1968 births
Living people
Bharatiya Janata Party politicians from Delhi
Indian National Congress politicians from Delhi
State cabinet ministers of Delhi
Delhi University alumni
Members of the Delhi Legislative Assembly
Delhi MLAs 2013–2015
Delhi MLAs 2008–2013
People from East Delhi district
\